Salemas (also Shallum, Salem and in the King James Bible, Sadamias) is an ancestor of Ezra in the Bible.

References

Old Testament people